Chivers is a surname. Notable people with the surname include:

 Barrie Chivers, Canadian politician
 C. J. (Christopher John) Chivers, American journalist
 Dirk Chivers, Dutch pirate
 Frank Chivers, English footballer
 Gary Chivers, English footballer
 Martin Chivers, English footballer
 Thomas Holley Chivers, American poet

See also
 Chivers and Sons, a British manufacturer of jams and preserves
 Chivers Biology Laboratory, part of the University of Saskatchewan
 The Chivers are a social group in the film Steak directed by Quentin Dupieux